Malda Sadar subdivision is an administrative subdivision of the Malda district in the Indian state of West Bengal.

Geography
Malda Sadar subdivision covers both the Barind Tract and the Diara, two of the three physiographic subregions of the district. The Barind “is made up of the ancient alluvial humps that are remnants of old riverine flood plains that remained unaffected subsequently by inundation and renewed silting.” It forms an upland slightly higher than the surrounding areas and extends beyond the borders of the district. “The Diara is a relatively well drained flat land formed by the fluvial deposition of newer alluvium in the transitional zone between the Barind upland and the marshy Tal tract. The soil is light with sandy appearance and is very fertile.

Subdivisions
Malda district is divided into two administrative subdivisions:

Administrative units
Malda Sadar subdivision has 9 police stations, 9 community development blocks, 9 panchayat samitis, 97 gram panchayats, 1,274 mouzas, 1,105 inhabited villages, 2 municipalities and 26 census towns. The municipalities are at English Bazar and Old Malda. The census towns are: Bandhail, Rangabhita, Baksinagar, Kachu Pukur, Kendua, Aiho, Jhangra, Chhatinamor, Sahapur, Milki, Sonatala, Bagbari, Chhota Suzapur, Bara Suzapur, Chaspara, Nazirpur, Jalalpur, Bamangram, Jadupur, Silampur, Baliadanga, Alipur, Karari Chandpur, Birodhi, Jagannathpur and Krishnapur. The subdivision has its headquarters at English Bazar.

Police stations
Police stations in Malda Sadar subdivision have the following features and jurisdiction:

Gram panchayats
The subdivision contains 97 gram panchayats under 9 community development blocks:

 English Bazar block consists of 11 gram panchayats, viz. Amriti, Jadupur–I, Kotwali, Narhatta, Binodpur, Jadupur–II, Mahadipur, Sovanagar, Fulbaria, Kajigram and Milki.
 Gazole block consists of 15 gram panchayats, viz. Alal, Chaknagar, Karkach, Raniganj–II, Bairgachhi–I, Deotala, Majhra, Sahajadpur, Bairgachhi–II, Gazole–I, Pandua, Salaidanga, Babupur, Gazole–II and Raniganj–I.
 Habibpur block consists of 11 gram panchayats, viz. Aktail, Bulbulchandi, Jajail, Rishipur, Aiho, Dhumpur, Kanturka, Sreerampur, Baidyapur, Habibpur and Mangalpur.
 Kaliachak I block consists of 14 gram panchayats, viz. Alinagar, Gayeshbari, Kaliachak–II, Silampur–II, Alipur–I, Jalalpur, Mozampur, Sujapur, Alipur–II, Jaluabadhal, Naoda–Jadupur, Bamongram–Mashimpur, Kaliachak–I, Silampur–I.
 Kaliachak II block consists of 9 gram panchayats, viz. Bangitola, Rajnagar, Uttar Lakshmipur, Gangaprasad, Rathbari, Uttar Panchanandapur–II, Hamidpur, Uttar Panchanandapur–I and Mothabari.ayet.
 Kaliachak III block consists of 14 gram panchayats, viz. Akandabaria, Bhagabanpur, Lakshmipur, Bakhrabad, Charianantapur, Pardeonapur–Sovapur, Bedrabad iu, Golapganj, Beernagar–I, Krishnapur, Sahabajpur, Beernagar–II, Kumbhira, Sahabanchak.
 Manikchak block consists of 11 gram panchayats, viz. Chowki Mirdadpur, Enayetpur, Manikchak, Nurpur, Dakshin Chandipur, Gopalpur, Mathurapur, Uttar Chandipur, Dharampur, Heeranandapur and Nazeerpur.
 Old Malda block consists of 6 gram panchayats, viz. Bhabuk, Mahisbathani, Muchia, Jatradanga, Mangalbari and Sahapur.
 Bamangola block consists of 6 gram panchayats, viz. Bamangola, Gobindapur–Maheshpur, Jagdala, Pakuahat, Chandpur and Madnabati.

Blocks
Community development blocks in Malda Sadar subdivision are:

Education
Malda district had a literacy rate of 61.73% (for population of 7 years and above) as per the census of India 2011. Malda Sadar subdivision had a literacy rate of 63.76% and Chanchal subdivision 57.68%.

Given in the table below (data in numbers) is a comprehensive picture of the education scenario in Malda district for the year 2013-14:

Note: Primary schools include junior basic schools; middle schools, high schools and higher secondary schools include madrasahs; technical schools include junior technical schools, junior government polytechnics, industrial technical institutes, industrial training centres, nursing training institutes etc.; technical and professional colleges include engineering colleges, medical colleges, para-medical institutes, management colleges, teachers training and nursing training colleges, law colleges, art colleges, music colleges etc. Special and non-formal education centres include sishu siksha kendras, madhyamik siksha kendras, centres of Rabindra mukta vidyalaya, recognised Sanskrit tols, institutions for the blind and other handicapped persons, Anganwadi centres, reformatory schools etc.

Educational institutions
The following institutions are located in the Malda Sadar subdivision:
University of Gour Banga was established at PO Mokdumpur, Malda, in 2008.
Malda College was established at Malda in 1944.
Malda Women's College was established at Malda in 1970.
Gour Mahavidyalaya was established at Mangal Bari, Old Malda in 1985.
South Malda College was established at Pubarun, Laksmipur, Kaliachak III, in 1995.
Kaliachak College was established at Sultanganj, Kaliachak I, in 1995.
Pakuahat Degree College was established in 1997 at Pakuahat.
Gazole Mahavidyalaya was established at Gazole Town in 2006.
Manikchak College was established at Mathurapur, Manikchak, in 2014.
Ghani Khan Choudhury Institute of Engineering & Technology was established at Narayanpur, Old Malda, in 2010. It offers degree and diploma courses in engineering.
IMPS College of Engineering and Technology was established in 2003 at Malda.
Malda Medical College and Hospital was established at Malda in 2011.

Healthcare
The table below (all data in numbers) presents an overview of the medical facilities available and patients treated in the hospitals, health centres and sub-centres in 2014 in Malda district.  
 

.* Excluding nursing homes

Medical facilities
Medical facilities available in Malda Sadar subdivision are as follows:
Hospitals: (Name, location, beds)
Malda District Hospital, English Bazar, 600 beds
Malda Railway Hospital, English Bazar, 100 beds
English Bazar Police Hospital, English Bazar, 30 beds
Raja Sarat Chandra TB Hospital, English Bazar, 30 beds
EBM Matri Sadan, English Bazar, 15 beds
Malda District Correctional Home Hospital, English Bazar, 10 beds
Rural Hospitals: (Name, block, location, beds)
Manikchak Rural Hospital, Manikchak CD Block, Manikchak, 30 beds
Gazole Rural Hospital, Gazole CD Block, Gazole, 30 beds
R.N.Roy Rural Hospital, Habibpur CD Block, Bulbulchandi, 30 beds
Bamangola Rural Hospital, Bamangola CD Block, Maheshpur, 30 beds
Hatimari Rural Hospital, Gazole CD Block, Hatimari, 30 beds
Moulpur Rural Hospital, Old Malda (M), Old Malda, 30 beds
Milki Rural Hospital, English Bazar CD Block, Milki, 30 beds
Silampur Rural Hospital, Kaliachak I CD Block, Silampur, PO Kaliachak, 30 beds
Bangitola Rural Hospital, Kaliachak II CD Block, Bangitola, 30 beds
Bedrabad Rural Hospital, Kaliachak III CD Block, Bedrabad, PO Baisnabnagar, 30 beds
Primary Health Centres: (CD Block-wise)(CD Block, PHC location, beds)
Manikchak CD Block: Bhutni (10), Mathurapur (4), Nurpur (4)
Gazole CD Block: Babupur (4), Kutubshahar (Pandua PHC) (10 ), Purba Ranipur (Ranipur PHC) (10)
Habibpur CD Block: Manikora (Bahadurpur PHC) (10), Goramary (Rishipur PHC) (4)
Bamangola CD Block: Ashrampur (Kashimpur PHC) (4), Nalagola (Uttar Nayapara PHC) (10)
Old Malda CD Block: Jatradanga (6), Mahadevpur (Muchia PHC) (10)
English Bazar CD Block: KG Chandipur (Chandipur PHC) (10), Mahadipur (10)
Kaliachak I CD Block: Sujapur (10), Jadupur (Naoda-Jadupur PHC) (2), Pirojpur (Narayanpur PHC) (2)
Kaliachak II CD Block: Rajnagar (Hamidpur PHC) (4), Mothabari (10)
Kaliachak III CD Block: Sabdalpur (Kumbhira PHC) (10), Gopalganj (10)

Electoral constituencies
Lok Sabha (parliamentary) and Vidhan Sabha (state assembly) constituencies in Malda Sadar subdivision were as follows:

References

Subdivisions of West Bengal
Subdivisions in Malda district
Malda district